Marco Mazza (born 25 June 1977) is an Italian long-distance runner who specializes in the 10,000 metres and half marathon.

Biography
His personal best time in the 10,000 metres is 27:44.05 minutes, achieved in April 2002 in Camaiore. This places him ninth on the Italian all-time performers list, behind Salvatore Antibo, Francesco Panetta, Venanzio Ortis, Daniele Meucci, Alberto Cova, Franco Fava, Stefano Mei, Stefano Baldini. His personal best half marathon time is 60:24 minutes, achieved in April 2002 in Milan.

Achievements

See also
 Italian all-time lists - Half marathon

References

External links
 

1977 births
Living people
Italian male long-distance runners
Athletes from Naples
World Athletics Championships athletes for Italy
Athletes (track and field) at the 2001 Mediterranean Games
Mediterranean Games competitors for Italy
20th-century Italian people
21st-century Italian people